is a passenger railway station located in the city of  Funabashi, Chiba Prefecture, Japan, operated by the private railway operator Shin-Keisei Electric Railway.

Lines
Yakuendai Station is served by the Shin-Keisei Line, and is located 22.5 kilometers from the terminus of the line at Matsudo Station.

Station layout 
The station consists of a single island platform, with an elevated station building.

Platforms

History
Yakuendai Station was opened on December 27, 1947. The station relocated to its present location and a new station building was completed by July 29, 2000.

Passenger statistics
In fiscal 2018, the station was used by an average of 15,229 passengers daily.

Surrounding area
 Funabashi Municipal Nanabayashi Junior High School
 Funabashi City Hasama Elementary School
 Funabashi Municipal Nanabayashi Elementary School

See also
 List of railway stations in Japan

References

External links

  Shin Keisei Railway Station information

Railway stations in Japan opened in 1947
Railway stations in Chiba Prefecture
Funabashi